"You Have Been Loved" is a song by English singer and songwriter George Michael, recorded for his third studio album, Older (1996). It was written by Michael and David Austin and produced by Michael. On 8 September 1997, "You Have Been Loved" was released as a double A-side single with "The Strangest Thing '97" and reached number two in the United Kingdom, behind Elton John's "Candle in the Wind 1997" charity record.

Background
Michael wrote "You Have Been Loved" about his lover, Anselmo Feleppa, who died of an AIDS-related illness in 1993. It was released as the sixth single from Older. "The Strangest Thing", also from the album, was remixed and re-recorded for this release as a more up-tempo track, the original version became more a dance-pop, middle eastern and bossa-nova song.

Critical reception
Matthew Hocter from Albumism said "You Have Been Loved" is "one of the album’s most heartbreaking and painfully personal love songs". A reviewer from Music Week rated it four out of five, describing it as "a gorgeous but painfully sad ballad about the lost of a loved one. May be too downbeat to get his usual feverish radio support, but should go Top 10." The magazine's Alan Jones felt it is "George at his most laidback." He added, "Beautifully sung mood music, it meanders melliflously for more than five minutes and is like a breath of fresh air, though the fact that Older has sold so many copies already, and the track's lack of a commercial hook, will limit its chart potential." An editor from Sunday Mirror wrote, "A beautiful ballad. Considering recent events, it strikes the perfect chord. Enough said." Alan Jackson from The Times declared it as a "lush, achingly tasteful ballad on bereavement" from "pop's King of Sorrows."

Track listings
 Asian, Australian, European, and UK CD EP
 "You Have Been Loved" – 5:29
 "The Strangest Thing '97" (Radio Mix) – 4:40
 "Father Figure" (Live from MTV Unplugged) – 6:13
 "Praying for Time" (Live from MTV Unplugged) – 5:22

 European and UK CD II
 "The Strangest Thing '97" (Loop Ratz Mix) – 8:46
 "The Strangest Thing '97" (Radio Mix) – 4:40
 "You Have Been Loved" – 5:29

 European CD single
 "You Have Been Loved" – 5:29
 "The Strangest Thing '97" (Radio Mix) – 4:40

Charts and certifications

Weekly charts

Year-end charts

Certifications

References

1996 songs
1997 singles
George Michael songs
LGBT-related songs
Pop ballads
Songs about HIV/AIDS
Commemoration songs
Songs written by David Austin (singer)
Songs written by George Michael
Song recordings produced by George Michael
Soul ballads
Virgin Records singles